Highs in the Mid-Sixties, Volume 22 (subtitled The South, Part 2) is a compilation album in the Highs in the Mid-Sixties series, featuring recordings that were released in the South excluding Texas (which is covered in 5 separate volumes).  Highs in the Mid-Sixties, Volume 8 is an earlier volume in the series that features bands from these Southern states.

Release data
This album was released in 1985 as an LP by AIP Records (as #AIP-10031).

Notes on the tracks
Evil Enc. Group (also known as Evil Encorporated) is a west Virginia band; these two cuts (from their first of two singles) made it onto Essential Pebbles, Volume 2.Evil Enc. was from Oak Hill, WV not from Beckley, WV.  They only recorded in Beckley.

Daze of the Week is actually from Tacoma, Washington, not Mississippi as the liner notes on this album claimed.  The band was active from 1966 to 1967 and put out one single in a very limited release.

Track listing

Side 1

 Daze of the Week: "One Night Stand" (Gregg Gagliardi) — rel. 1966
 Dick Watson 5: "Cold Clear World" (Dick Watson)
 The Nomads: "Time Remains" (Fontenot/Doucet)
 Creatures, Inc.: "Letters of Love" (Christie/Phillips)
 Evil Enc. Group: "Hey You" (Gent/Micheal/Dunlap/James)
 Evil Enc. Group: "The Point Is" (Gent/Micheal/Dunlap/James)
 The Flys: "Reality Composition No. 1" (The Flys)

Side 2
 The Counts IV : "Spoonful" (Willie Dixon) — rel. 1967
 Jimmy & the Offbeats : "Stronger than Dirt" (T. Guarino/B.G. Fussell/D. Short)
 Jimmy & the Offbeats: "I Ain't No Miracle Worker" (Nancie Mantz/Annette Tucker)
 The Rondels: "One More Chance" (The Rondels)
 Rick & Ronnie: "Don't Do Me this Way"
 The 5: "I'm No Good"
 The Countdowns: "Cover of Night" (Don Griffin/Don Strickland)

Pebbles (series) albums
1985 compilation albums